Led Zeppelin's Summer 1969 North American Tour was the third concert tour of North America by the English rock band. The tour commenced on 5 July and concluded on 31 August 1969.

By this point in the band's career, Led Zeppelin were earning $30,000 a night for each of the concerts they performed. According to music journalist Chris Welch:

This concert tour is noteworthy for the number of festival appearances made by Led Zeppelin. These include:
5 July – Atlanta International Pop Festival
6 July – Newport Jazz Festival
11 July – Laurel Pop Festival
12 July – Summer Pop Festival
21 July – Schaefer Music Festivalheadliners at New York City's Wollman Rink, along with B.B. King
25 July – Midwest Rock Festival
27 July – Seattle Pop Festivalthe infamous shark episode is alleged to have taken place at this time
30 August – Singer Bowl Music Festival
31 August – Texas International Pop Festival

Tour set list
During the tour, Led Zeppelin usually played the same songs in the same order:

"Train Kept A-Rollin' "
"I Can't Quit You Baby"
"Dazed and Confused"
"You Shook Me"
"White Summer" / "Black Mountain Side"
"How Many More Times"the medley portion was sometimes expanded to include "The Lemon Song" and some early rock & roll and blues numbers
"Communication Breakdown"
The group sometimes added:
"I Gotta Move" (8 August, while Page replaced a broken guitar string) 
"What Is and What Should Never Be" (11 July & 21 August)
"Pat's Delight" (18 July)
"Your Time Is Gonna Come" (14 August)
"Long Tall Sally" (6 July, 12 July, & 30 August)

Tour dates

References

Sources

 

Led Zeppelin concert tours
1969 concert tours
1969 in North America